Hemaýat Kömekow (born 3 May 1991) is a Turkmenistan footballer currently playing for HTTU Asgabat. He has been capped by the national team 2 times.

References

1991 births
Living people
Turkmenistan footballers
Turkmenistan international footballers
Association football defenders
Place of birth missing (living people)
Footballers at the 2010 Asian Games
Asian Games competitors for Turkmenistan